The Beauty Shop is a lost 1922 American silent comedy film directed by Edward Dillon and written by Doty Hobart based upon the play of the same name by Channing Pollock and Rennold Wolf. The film stars Raymond Hitchcock, Billy B. Van, James J. Corbett, Louise Fazenda, Madeline Fairbanks, and Marion Fairbanks. The film was released on May 14, 1922, by Paramount Pictures.

Plot
As described in a film magazine, Dr. Arbutus Budd (Hitchcock) is besieged by creditors who insist on being repaid, telling one holding a bill while he held a saxophone that "I can't pay it but I can play it." Dr. Budd has purchased the right to the crest of an impoverished nobleman and is using it on the bottles of lotions that he sells. This nobleman, the last of the Sizerella, fled to escape the undertaker as it is the time-honored custom in their native town of Bologna for a Sizerella to be shot by a Maldonado. Sobini (Van) has come to the United States to bring back a Sizerella to be shot by a Maldonado. He finds Dr. Budd and decides to bring him back as "all Sizerellas look alike to him." Dr. Budd, eager to escape his creditors, willing goes with him, bringing his ward and attorney. In Bologna the innkeepers daughter falls for Dr. Budd, but he has his eye on Cola (Marion Fairbanks), while her twin sister Coca (Madeline Fairbanks) loves the scion of the rival house of Madonado (Love). Dr. Budd spends the rest of the film turning back a clock to escape the hour set for the duel, mixing up the twins, and avoiding marriage to the innkeepers daughter, who in the end uses the doctor's "Cremo" beauty lotion to become a desirable maiden, with even her hair becoming curled by the treatment.

Cast
Raymond Hitchcock as Dr. Arbutus Budd
Billy B. Van as Sobini
James J. Corbett as Panatella
Louise Fazenda as Cremo Panatella
Madeline Fairbanks as Coca
Marion Fairbanks as Cola
Diana Allen as Ann Budd
Montagu Love as Maldonado
Larry Wheat as Phil Briggs

References

External links

1922 films
1920s English-language films
Silent American comedy films
1922 comedy films
Paramount Pictures films
Films directed by Edward Dillon
American black-and-white films
Lost American films
American silent feature films
1922 lost films
Lost comedy films
1920s American films